Miss Universo Chile 2016, the 53rd Miss Universo Chile pageant, was held on November 9, 2016. María Belén Jerez Spuler crowned Catalina Cáceres at end of the event. Cáceres represented Chile at Miss Universe 2016 pageant.

Final results

Delegates 
The 15 official delegates were selected on several castings.

Judges
 Photographer, painter and commentator of Chilean shows, Jordi Castell.
 Canadian/Chilean actress and musician, Vesta Lugg.
 Chilean model and businesswoman, Carolina Parsons.
 Venezuelan TV Host and social communicator, Harry Levy.

Notes
 Valentina Schnitzer won the Miss Supranational Chile 2015 pageant and also participated in Reina Hispanoamericana 2017.
 Natividad Leiva won Miss Earth Chile 2015 pageant and finished as Top 8 in Miss Earth 2015. Also, she participated on Miss United Continents 2016 pageant in Guayaquil, Ecuador.
 Natalia Lermanda won Miss Earth Chile 2013 pageant and finished as Top 16 in Miss Earth 2013. 
 Catalina Cáceres won Miss Earth Chile 2014 pageant.
 Charlotte Molina withdrew of the competition.

References

External links
 Official Miss Universo Chile website

Miss Universo Chile
2016 in Chile
2016 beauty pageants